Central Stadium (Tsentralnyi Stadion) is a multi-purpose stadium in Astrakhan, Russia.  It is used mostly for football matches and is the home stadium of Volgar Astrakhan.  The stadium holds 21,500 people, all seated.

The territory of the Central Stadium has long been used as a venue for various city and regional celebrations. Gazprom and Lukoil companies arrange their anniversary concerts here. Also, the Central Stadium gained extensive experience in holding large-scale holidays, including the Tatar Sabantuy, which received federal status. Large Astrakhan companies "Elko", "Leader" and others also use the main arena of the city of Astrakhan to draw their prizes.

The venue hosted 2015 Russian Cup Final between Lokomotiv Moscow and Kuban Krasnodar. This was the first time Central Stadium had been chosen to host Russian Cup final.

References

External links
Stadium Information

Sports venues completed in 1955
Sports venues built in the Soviet Union
Football venues in Russia
Sport in Astrakhan
Multi-purpose stadiums in Russia
FC Volgar Astrakhan
Buildings and structures in Astrakhan Oblast
1955 establishments in Russia